Sorasha is a lake in the Sarysu District, Jambyl Region, Kazakhstan.

Geography
Sorasha lies in the lower Chu river basin. The main lake body is in the northern part and a narrow sound connects it with a long southwestern projection that stretches from north to south. An unnamed river enters the lake from the southern end. 

Usually Sorasha freezes in November and its ice thaws by April.

See also
List of lakes of Kazakhstan

References

External links

Chu-Talas, Kazakhstan
Оқу - Atau.kz
САРЫСУ АУДАНЫ

Lakes of Kazakhstan
Jambyl Region
Chu (river)